2MASS J18082002−5104378 (abbreviated J1808−5104) is an ultra metal-poor (UMP) binary star system, in the constellation Ara, about  from Earth, and is a single-lined spectroscopic binary (SB1). It is one of the oldest stars in the universe, about 13.53 billion years old, possibly one of the first stars, a star made almost entirely of materials released from the Big Bang. A tiny unseen companion, a low-mass UMP star, is particularly unusual.

System
It is a single-lined spectroscopic binary, with radial velocity variations in its spectral absorption lines interpreted as orbital motion of the visible star. The companion is invisible, but inferred from the orbit.

J1808−5104 is the brightest UMP star, as a binary system, known, and is part of the "thin disk" of the Milky Way, the part of the galaxy in which the Sun is located, but unusual for such a metal-poor and old star. At , the star is the oldest known thin-disk star, and several billion years older than most estimates for the age of the Milky Way's thin disk.

Primary star
The primary component of the binary star system, 2MASS J18082002−5104378 A, is a subgiant, cooler than the Sun, but larger and more luminous.

Secondary star
It is the first low-mass UMP star to be discovered, and one of the oldest stars in the universe, about 13.53 billion years old. It is possibly one of the first stars, a star made almost entirely of materials released from the Big Bang.

References

External links 
 
 
  (5 November 2018; Johns Hopkins University)

Ara (constellation)
20181101
November 2018 events
J18082002−5104378
TIC objects
Spectroscopic binaries